Ramswaroop Lamba is an Indian politician from the Bharatiya Janata Party and a member of the Rajasthan Legislative Assembly representing the Nasirabad Vidhan Sabha constituency of Rajasthan.

Father  :-  Pr. Sanwarlal jat  (Minister of B.J.P. from    Rajasthan)

District president of national hockey team

References 

Bharatiya Janata Party politicians from Rajasthan
Living people
Year of birth missing (living people)
Rajasthan MLAs 2018–2023